Jek Yeun Thong  (29 July 1930 – 3 June 2018) was a Singaporean politician who served as Minister for Science and Technology between 1976 and 1977, Minister for Culture between 1968 and 1977 and Minister for Labour between 1963 and 1968.

Political career
In 1955, Jek's foray into politics began when he assisted the People's Action Party (PAP) during the 1955 general election. He was appointed to the party's Central Executive Committee (CEC) as a political secretary in 1957. That same year, he was detained under the Internal Security Act by Lim Yew Hock's government.

He was eventually released and when the PAP formed the Government, he held the posts of Assistant Treasurer and then Treasurer on the Central Executive Committee of the PAP between 1959 and 1976. Apart from serving as the deputy chairman of the People's Association (PA), he also served as Minister of Culture for 12 years between 1968 and 1978.

Additionally, he also served as Minister for Science and Technology between 1976 and 1977. He is credited for being one of the 10 ministers who signed the Independence of Singapore Agreement in 1965.

Together with Lee Khoon Choy, Jek was appointed as the government representatives on the Joint-Government-University Liaison Committee in 1960 to reform Nanyang University.

Jek was considered as one of the 'Old Guard'—the first generation of leaders of independent Singapore.

One of his final major public appearances was at the National Day Parade of 2015 in remembrance of Lee Kuan Yew.

Death
Jek died at home at the age of 87 on 3 June 2018. A private wake and funeral was held in accordance with his wishes. As a mark of respect, the government ordered the state flag on all government buildings to be flown at half-mast on 7 June 2018.

Honours and awards
Jek was awarded the Second Class of the Order of Nila Utama in 1990.

References

Bibliography
 Lam, Peng Er and Tan, Kevin (Ed.) (2000). Lee's lieutenants : Singapore's old guard. Singapore: Allen & Unwin. 

1930 births
2018 deaths
Members of the Parliament of Singapore
People's Action Party politicians
Prisoners and detainees of Singapore
Singaporean people of Cantonese descent
Singaporean prisoners and detainees
Ministers for Labour of Singapore